Henri de Gondi  (1572 – 13 August 1622) was a French bishop and cardinal of the Gondi family.  He was the son of Albert de Gondi, duc de Retz and Claude Catherine de Clermont-Tonnerre.  He succeeded his uncle Pierre de Gondi as bishop of Paris in 1598 and was succeeded on his death by his younger brother Jean-François de Gondi.  He was made a cardinal in 1618.

References

1572 births
1622 deaths
17th-century French cardinals
Bishops of Paris